is a trans-Neptunian object from the classical Kuiper belt, located in the outermost region of the Solar System. The binary classical Kuiper belt object belongs to the cold population.

Discovery and orbit
 was discovered on 21 August 2001 by Marc William Buie from Cerro Tololo Observatory, La Serena, Chile.  belongs to the dynamically cold population of the classical Kuiper belt objects, which have small orbital eccentricities and inclinations. Their semi-major axes reside mainly in the interval 40–45 AU.

Satellite
 is a binary system consisting of two components of approximately equal size. The satellite was discovered on 18 April 2006. Assuming that both components have the same albedo, the primary is estimated to be about 169 km in diameter. The size of the secondary (satellite) in this case is estimated at around 154 km. The total mass of the system is approximately 4 kg. The average density of both components is about 1 g/cm3.

Physical properties
The surfaces of both components of  appear to have a red color. The rotational period is either 5.84 or 11.68 hours.

Notes

References

External links 
 
 

275809
Discoveries by Marc Buie
275809
20010821